Percy Brown may refer to:

 Percy Brown (art historian) (1872–1955), British scholar, artist and Indologist
 Percy Edgar Brown (1885–1937), soil scientist at Iowa State University
 Percy Brown (rugby league), English rugby league footballer who played in the 1920s
 Percy Shiras Brown (1883–1973), American management consulting engineer

See also
 Percy Browne (1923–2004), English businessman, farmer, amateur jockey and Conservative Party politician
 Allan Percy Brown (1912–1994), boxer and politician in Saskatchewan, Canada